Robin Dahlstrøm (born 29 January 1988) is a Norwegian former professional ice hockey player who is last played for Storhamar in the Norwegian hockey league GET-ligaen in 2021.

Dahlstrøm has played primarily in his native Norway for the Frisk Asker organization, including his junior and most of his professional career. In 2011 he moved to the Swedish club IF Troja/Ljungby in the HockeyAllsvenskan.

For the 2013–14 season Dahlstrøm signed with Örebro HK of the SHL. He was also loaned to HockeyAllsvenskan club Djurgårdens IF for several matches.

Dahlstrøm competed in the 2013 IIHF World Championship as a member of the Norway men's national ice hockey team. He was also named to Norway's 25 man roster for the 2014 Winter Olympics.

Mats Zuccarello of the Minnesota Wild (NHL) and Fabian Zuccarello of the Valencia Flyers (WSHL) are his step-brothers

Awards
2005 - Bronze medal WJC-18 Div.1 (Norway U18)
2008 - Gold medal WJC-20 Div.1 (Norway U20)
2010–11 - Norwegian Champion (Sparta Warriors)

Career statistics

Regular season and playoffs

International

References

External links

1988 births
Living people
AIK IF players
Djurgårdens IF Hockey players
Frisk Asker Ishockey players
Ice hockey players at the 2014 Winter Olympics
Herning Blue Fox players
Lørenskog IK players
Norwegian ice hockey forwards
Olympic ice hockey players of Norway
Örebro HK players
Sparta Warriors players
Storhamar Dragons players
Ice hockey people from Oslo
IF Troja/Ljungby players
Norwegian expatriate ice hockey people
Norwegian expatriate sportspeople in Sweden
Norwegian expatriate sportspeople in Denmark
Expatriate ice hockey players in Denmark
Expatriate ice hockey players in Sweden